Nieder- and Oberurnen railway station is a railway station in the municipality of Glarus Nord in the Swiss canton of Glarus. It is an intermediate stop on the Ziegelbrücke–Linthal line of Swiss Federal Railways, and serves the twin villages of Niederurnen and Oberurnen.

The station is served by the St. Gallen S-Bahn service S6 between Rapperswil and Schwanden, which operates hourly.

Services 
 the following services stop at Nieder- and Oberurnen:

References

External links 
 
 

Nieder- and Oberurnen
Nieder- and Oberurnen